Atha Okinti Kodale is a 1958 Indian Telugu-language comedy drama film produced and directed by K. B. Tilak. Based on a play by Barampuram Kollady, it features an ensemble cast consisting of Jaggayya, Girija, Ramanamurthy, Prameela, Ramana Reddy, Hemalatha, Suryakantham, P. Lakshmikanthamma and Perumallu. The film, dealing with the relationship between mothers-in-law and their daughters-in-law, was released on 12 September 1958, and became a major commercial success. It was later remade in Tamil as Mamiyarum Oru Veetu Marumagale (1961) and in Hindi as Saas Bhi Kabhi Bahu Thi (1970).

Plot 

Vardhi Subbarayudu, a spiritual man, is the husband of Tayaramma, an obstinate woman who dislikes her mother-in-law Parvathamma. At a temple, Tayaramma meets a woman named Sobha; impressed by her character, she decides to make her as her daughter-in-law. She is also relieved after realising that her son Raghuram and Sobha are already in love. Sobha's mother Sundaramma is ill-tempered, and disowns her daughter-in-law Lakshmi because her father Rangaiah failed to pay her the requested dowry. Sundaramma's meek son Chandram is absent-minded, and always involved in playing the fiddle, while ignoring his wife's plight. The good relationship between Sobha and Tayaramma eventually worsens and Sobha returns to her mother's home. The rest of the film deals with how Sobha and Raghu, along with Subbarayudu, pacify the shrewd Tayaramma and Sundaramma, and fix things for both families.

Cast 
Credits adapted from The Hindu:
 Jaggayya as Raghuram
 Girija as Sobha
 Ramanamurthy as Chandram
 Prameela as Lakshmi
 Ramana Reddy as Vardhi Subbarayudu
 Hemalatha as Tayaramma
Suryakantham as Sundaramma
 P. Lakshmikanthamma as Parvathamma
 Perumallu as Rangaiah
 Chadalavada as Kotaiah
 Sita as Mangi

Production 
Atha Okinti Kodale is based on a play by Barampuram Kollady. Film producer-director K. B. Tilak hired Pinisetty Sri Ramamurthy to convert Kollady's play into a screenplay. Ch. Venkateswara Rao served as editor, Lakshman Gore was the cinematographer, B. Chalam handled art direction and B. Sathyam was co-director. K. Bapayya worked as an assistant director, in addition to making a cameo appearance as a friend of Raghuram (Jaggayya).

Soundtrack 
The soundtrack was composed by Pendyala, and the lyrics were written by Aarudra. Songs that attained popularity were "Asokavanamuna Sita" (sung by P. Susheela), "Jodugulla Pistholu Thaa" (Ghantasala), "Paila Paila Pacheesu" and "Rammante Vachchanu Ammayi Garu" (both sung by P. B. Sreenivas and Jikki), "Mayadaari Keesulaata" (Pithapuram Nageswara Rao and Swarnalatha) and the poem "Buddhochenaa Neeku Manasaa" rendered by Madhavapeddi Satyam.

Release and reception 
Atha Okinti Kodale was released on 12 September 1958, and became a major commercial success. The film was remade by Tilak in Tamil as Mamiyarum Oru Veetu Marumagale (1961), which did not achieve the same success. It was later remade by Vasu Menon in Hindi as Saas Bhi Kabhi Bahu Thi (1970).

References

External links 
 

1950s Telugu-language films
1958 comedy-drama films
1958 films
Indian black-and-white films
Indian comedy-drama films
Indian films based on plays
Telugu films remade in other languages